The anime series,  is based on the Japanese light novel of the same name written by Tomohiro Matsu and illustrated by Yuka Nakajima. Its anime adaption is produced by PPP and animated by Feel. The story follows Yuuta Segawa, a first year college student. After his sister goes missing in a plane crash, he is left to care for his sister's three daughters from her marriage.

The series aired in Japan between January 11, 2012, and March 28, 2012, with an additional episode released on the fifth Blu-ray/DVD volume on July 1, 2012. The series was simulcast by Crunchyroll. An original video animation was bundled with the 13th light novel volume on June 25, 2013. Sentai Filmworks released the series in North America on February 5, 2013.

Two theme music were used for the series: The opening theme is "Happy Girl" by Eri Kitamura while "Coloring" by Yui Horie is used for the ending.

Production team
List of Listen to Me, Girls, I Am Your Father!s original work was written by Tomohiro Matsu and illustrated by Yuka Nakajima. The producer company is PPP with animations done by Feel, art by Studio Biho, music by Starchild Records, and voice recordings done by Studio Mausu. The overall series is directed Itsuro Kawasaki and his assistant Kei Oikawa. Other directors includes Toshihiro Kohama who directed the art, Yoshikazu Iwanami the sound, and Yasumasa Koyama the sound effects. The script of the animation were written by Naruhisa Arakawa, Yoshimi Narita, Masaharu Amiya, and Keiichirō Ōchi and the character designs were created by Takashi Mamezuka.

Episode list

Home media releases
King Records (Japan) compiled the individual episodes into Blu-ray and DVD compilations in Japan. The first Blu-ray volume was released on March 7, 2012, while the first DVD volume was slated for April 11, 2012.

Notes and references
Notes
 The episodes air after midnight JST but are presented on the previous day's schedule.

General

Specific

External links
 Official anime website 

Listen to Me, Girls. I Am Your Father!